Firdaus (mononymic; born May 2, 1960) is the current mayor of Pekanbaru, capital of Riau province and the third-most populous city on the Indonesian island of Sumatra. He had been elected as mayor twice and 2017 where he won 92,384 votes (32.99%).

References

Living people
1960 births
Mayors and regents of places in Riau
People from Pekanbaru
Mayors of places in Indonesia